Robert Edward French (30 April 1918 – 1 July 2006) was an Australian sailor. He competed for Australia at three Olympic Games, in 1948 in the Firefly class and in 1956 and 1960 in the Star class.

References

External links
 
 
  (archive)
 

1918 births
2006 deaths
Sailors at the 1948 Summer Olympics – Firefly
Sailors at the 1956 Summer Olympics – Star
Sailors at the 1960 Summer Olympics – Star
Olympic sailors of Australia
Australian male sailors (sport)
20th-century Australian people